Marky Mark and the Funky Bunch was an American hip-hop group formed in 1991 by Mark Wahlberg (alias Marky Mark), Scott Gee, Hector the Booty Inspector, DJ-T, and Ashey Ace. The group's best known song is "Good Vibrations", which made it to number one on the Billboard Hot 100 in 1991, while their follow-up song "Wildside" peaked at number 10.

History
Marky Mark and the Funky Bunch released their debut album, Music for the People on July 23, 1991. The album was a huge success for the group, making it to No. 1 on the Top Heatseekers chart and No. 21 on the Billboard 200. The album's success was fueled by two top-10 singles, both of which were certified gold, "Good Vibrations", which went to No. 1 on the Billboard Hot 100, and "Wildside" which went to No. 10 on the Hot 100. The album itself first went gold on November 15, 1991, before being certified platinum on January 14, 1992.

At the height of the group's success, they also had a video game released by Digital Pictures entitled Marky Mark and the Funky Bunch: Make My Video, but the game was not a success and has been considered one of the worst video games ever made.

After the success of Music for the People, the group quickly recorded a follow-up entitled You Gotta Believe that was released on September 15, 1992. However, the album achieved little success, only making it as high as No. 67 on the Billboard 200, as did the album's lone charting single also titled "You Gotta Believe" which went to 49 on the Hot 100. The group disbanded in 1993 with their last appearance being "I Want You", which was featured on the Super Mario Bros. movie soundtrack.

After the group disbanded, Mark continued his music career by teaming with reggae musician Prince Ital Joe. The duo released two albums in Europe and had a No. 1 hit in Germany with "United". Mark continued to release music until retiring in 1998 and becoming a successful actor in the United States.

Members 

 Marky Mark (Mark Wahlberg)
 DJ-T (Terry Yancey)
 Ashey Ace (Anthony "Ace" Thomas)
 Hector the Booty Inspector (Hector Barros)
 Scottie Gee (Scott Ross)

Discography

Studio albums

Singles

Promotional singles

Awards and nominations

Grammy Awards

MTV Video Music Awards

American Music Awards

Smash Hits Poll

References

American hip hop groups
Hip house music groups
Interscope Records artists
Mark Wahlberg
Musical groups disestablished in 1993
Musical groups disestablished in 2008
Musical groups established in 1989
Musical groups from Boston
Musical groups reestablished in 2007